Pultenaea sericea, commonly known as chaffy bush-pea, is a species of flowering plant in the family Fabaceae and is endemic to south-eastern Australia. It is a small, straggling shrub with hairy branches, elliptic to linear leaves, and yellow and red to purple, pea-like flowers.

Description

Taxonomy
Chaffy bush-pea was first formally described in 1864 by George Bentham who gave it the name Pultenaea paleacea var. sericea in Flora Australiensis. In 1995, Margaret Georgina Corrick raised the variety to species status as Pultenaea sericea in the journal Muelleria, and the name is accepted by the Australian Plant Census. The specific epithet (sericea) means "silky".

Distribution and habitat
Pultenaea sericea mainly grows in coastal heathland and seasonally wet areas east of Melbourne. It also occurs in north-eastern Tasmania and there is a single record from the Nadgee Nature Reserve in New South Wales.

Conservation status
This species is listed as "vulnerable" under the Tasmanian Government Threatened Species Protection Act 1995.

References

Fabales of Australia
Flora of New South Wales
Flora of Tasmania
Flora of Victoria (Australia)
sericea
Plants described in 1864
Taxa named by George Bentham